The Man from Snowy River may refer to:

 "The Man from Snowy River" (poem), an 1890 Australian poem by Banjo Paterson.
 The Man from Snowy River and Other Verses an 1895 poetry collection by Banjo Paterson (including the above)
 The Man from Snowy River (1920 film), a silent black & white film
 The Man from Snowy River (1982 film)
 The Man from Snowy River (soundtrack) (the soundtrack for the 1982 film The Man from Snowy River)
 The Man from Snowy River II, the 1988 sequel to the 1982 film
 Return to Snowy River (the soundtrack for the 1988 sequel film The Man from Snowy River II)
 The Man from Snowy River (TV series)
 The Man from Snowy River: Arena Spectacular, a musical theatre production which toured Australia during 2002
 The Man from Snowy River: Arena Spectacular (film)
 The Man from Snowy River: Arena Spectacular (original soundtrack) (the original musical cast album)